Holdren is a surname. Notable people with the surname include:

Dax Holdren (born 1972), American beach volleyball player
Jim Holdren (born 1942), American track and field coach
John Holdren (born 1944), American scientist, writer and science advisor
Judd Holdren (1915–1974), American actor